The world's religions have had differing relationships with alcohol. Many religions forbid alcoholic consumption or see it as sinful or negative. Others have allocated a specific place for it, such as in the Christian practice of using wine during the Eucharist rite.

Baháʼí Faith 
The teachings of the Baháʼí Faith forbids the consumption of alcohol and other drugs unless prescribed by a physician. Intoxicants take away reason, interfere with making moral decisions, and harm the mind and body. Baháʼís are also encouraged to avoid jobs related to the production or sale of alcohol and are forbidden from involvement in the drug trade. Those addicted to alcohol or other drugs should seek medical assistance from doctors and/or support from organizations dedicated to curing addiction.

Christianity
Christian views on alcohol are varied. Throughout the first 1,800 years of Church history, Christians generally consumed alcoholic beverages as a common part of everyday life and used "the fruit of the vine" in their central rite—the Eucharist or Lord's Supper. They held that both the Bible and Christian tradition taught that alcohol is a gift from God that makes life more joyous, but that over-indulgence leading to drunkenness is sinful or at least a vice.

In the mid-19th century, some Protestant Christians moved from a position of allowing moderate use of alcohol (sometimes called moderationism) to either deciding that not imbibing was wisest in the present circumstances (abstentionism) or prohibiting all ordinary consumption of alcohol because it was believed to be a sin (prohibitionism). Many Protestant churches, particularly Methodists and other Evangelical groups, advocate for abstentionism and prohibitionism, being early leaders in the temperance movement of the 19th and 20th centuries; the Book of Discipline of the Evangelical Methodist Church Conference, for example, teaches:

Churches in the Methodist tradition (inclusive of those aligned with the holiness movement) require that "pure, unfermented juice of the grape" be used in the sacrament of Holy Communion.

Today, these positions exist in Christianity, but the position of moderationism remains the most common worldwide, due to the adherence by the largest bodies of Christians, namely Lutheranism, Roman Catholicism, Eastern Orthodoxy and Anglicanism.

In the Catholic Church, the Eucharistic wine becomes the Blood of Jesus Christ through transubstantiation. In Lutheran theology, the blood of Christ is in, with and under the sacramental wine (cf. sacramental union). The Plymouth Brethren teach that the wine is a symbol of the blood of Christ. Monastic communities like Trappists have brewed beer and made wine.

Hinduism
Hinduism does not have a central authority which is followed by all Hindus, though religious texts forbid the use or consumption of alcohol. In Śruti texts such as Vedas and Upanishads which are the most authoritative texts in Hinduism and considered apauruṣeya, which means "not of a man, superhuman", all alcoholic drinks or intoxication are considered as a recipe of sinfulness, weakness, failure and destruction in several verses:

In Smriti texts which are considered less authoritative than Sruti, the verses contradict each other. 

In Adi Shankara's Shankara Bhashya and Ramanuja's Sri Bhasya on Brahma Sutras, they quote Kathaka Samhita against drinking alcohol.

Some sects, like the Aghori, use it as part of their ritual.

Buddhism
Observant Buddhists typically avoid consuming alcohol (referring to types of intoxicating fermented beverages), as it violates the 5th of the Five Precepts, the basic Buddhist code of ethics and can disrupt mindfulness and impede one's progress in the Noble Eightfold Path.

Jainism
In Jainism, no alcohol consumption of any kind is allowed, neither are there any exceptions like occasional or social drinking. The most important reason against alcohol consumption is the effect of alcohol on the mind and soul. In Jainism, any action or reaction that alter or impacts the mind is violence (himsa) towards own self, which is a five-sense human being. Violence to other five sense beings or to own self is violence. Jains do not consume fermented foods (beer, wine and other alcohols) to avoid killing of a large number of microorganisms associated with the fermenting process.

Sikhism
An initiated Sikh cannot use or consume intoxicants, of which wine is one.

Islam
In the Quran, khamr, meaning "wine", is variably referenced as an incentive from Satan, as well as a cautionary note against its adverse effect on human attitude in several verses:

Another verse acknowledges the benefit of wine but notes that its harm is bigger.

The Quran states that one of the delights of Paradise for the righteous is wine as a promise by God.

Islamic countries have low rates of alcohol consumption. However, a minority of Muslims do drink and believe consuming alcohol is not Qur'anically forbidden (haram).

During the time of Muhammad 
At the beginning of Islam, even during the first battles, Muslims possibly drank alcohol. According to Sunni hadiths (which are not universally accepted by Muslims), the prohibition of alcohol came many years after Muhammad had started his mission. It is reported that Jābir ibn Abd Allah (جابِر بن عَبْد الله) narrated: "Some people drank alcoholic beverages in the morning [of the day] of the ’Uhud battle and on the same day they were killed as martyrs, and that was before wine was prohibited." ’Anas ibn Mālik (أَنَس بن مالِك) narrated that the people said: "...some people [Muslims] were killed in the Battle of ’Uhud while wine was in their stomachs.' [...] So Allah revealed: 'There is not upon those who believe and do righteousness [any] blame concerning what they have eaten [in the past] if they [now] fear Allah and believe and do righteous deeds...'" [sura 5:93]

Some scholars and writers, for example Gerald Drissner, suggested that the fact that the Muslims were sober (and their enemies possibly drunk) led to an advantage in battles. This could have been the reason why the Muslims - although most of the time outnumbered - were advancing so quickly and defeated the enemy (Meccans) with relative ease.

Judaism

Judaism relates to consumption of alcohol, particularly of wine, in a complex manner. Wine is viewed as a substance of import and it is incorporated in religious ceremonies, and the general consumption of alcoholic beverages is permitted, however inebriation (drunkenness) is discouraged.

This compound approach to wine can be viewed in the verse in Psalms 104:15, "Wine gladdens human hearts," countered by the verses in Proverbs 20:1, "Wine is a mocker, strong drink is riotous; and whoever stumbles in it is not wise," and Proverbs 23:20, "Be not among drunkards or among gluttonous eaters of meat."

The Bible 
The biblical narrative records the positive and negative aspects of wine. 
Wine is a beverage of significance and import, utilized in ceremonies, for example, celebrating Abraham's military victory and successful liberation of Lot, festive meals, and the libations comprising the sacrificial service.

In Gen. 9:20-27, Noah becomes intoxicated from his wine on exiting the ark and lies unclothed in his tent where his youngest son, Ham, discovers Noah asleep, and "views his (Noah's) nakedness." Noah becomes aware of this the following day and curses Ham's son Canaan. In Gen. 19:31-37, in the aftermath of the destruction of Sodom and Gomorrah, Lot became inebriated on wine and had sexual intercourse with his two daughters. Moab (the father of the biblical nation by the same name) and Ben-Ammi (the father of the nation of Ammon) were born to Lot of this incest with his daughters. Religious service in the Temple must be void of consumption of alcohol or wine, as the priests are admonished, "Do not drink wine nor strong drink... when you enter the tabernacle of the congregation, lest you die."

In halakha 
Halakha (Jewish law) mandates the use of wine in various religious ceremonies (such as sanctifying the Sabbath and festivals with wine at their start and conclusion, and at circumcision and at marriage ceremonies). The beverage required as "wine" by Jewish law generally permits the use of a non-alcoholic grape extraction (grape juice) for all ceremonies requiring wine .

Excessive consumption and drunkenness, however are discouraged. According to the thirteenth century Orchot Chaim, as quoted in Beit Yosef "inebriation is entirely prohibited and there is no greater sin than drunkenness" and it is "the cause of many sins".

A Nazirite voluntarily takes a vow to abstain from grapes or any of their byproducts (including wine), he refrains cutting the hair on his head, and he may not become ritually impure by contact with corpses or graves. While one motivation for becoming a Nazirite may be a reaction to "risky behaviors" associated with alcohol use disorder (Tractate Sotah, BT 2a), the term of the vow of the Nazirite is ordinarily a fixed term, with grapes and wine again permitted at the end of the term.

Contemporary Judaism 
Anecdotal evidence supports that Jewish communities, on the whole, view alcoholic consumption more negatively than Protestant Christian groups. The small sample of Jews viewed alcohol as destructive while a sample of Protestants referred to it as "relaxing". The proliferation of "kiddush clubs" in some synagogues, and the institutional backlash to that proliferation, however, may provide an indication of growing awareness of alcohol use disorder issues in Jewish communities. A number of specifically Jewish non-profit addiction rehabilitation and education programs, such as the Chabad Residential Treatment Center in Los Angeles and Retorno in Israel, provide treatment for alcohol use disorder (and other substance use disorders) within a specifically Jewish framework for recovery. The non-profit Jewish institutions are supplemented by for-profit rehab centers with a Jewish focus.

Shinto

Sake is often consumed as part of Shinto purification rituals. Sakes served to gods as offerings prior to drinking are called Omiki . People drink Omiki with gods to communicate with them and to solicit rich harvests the following year.

Vodou (Voodoo)
In the Vodou faith of Haiti, alcoholic drinks such as rum are consumed to be able to allow spirits called "lwa" to enter one's body and help them find the motivation for or strength to survive everyday struggles or life.

Historical religions

In Ancient Egyptian religion, beer and wine were drunk and offered to the gods in rituals and festivals. Beer and wine were also stored with the mummified dead in Egyptian burials. Other ancient religious practices like Chinese ancestor worship, Sumerian and Babylonian religion used alcohol as offerings to gods and to the deceased. The Mesopotamian cultures had various wine gods and a Chinese imperial edict (c. 1,116 B.C.) states that drinking alcohol in moderation is prescribed by Heaven.

In the ancient Mediterranean world, the Cult of Dionysus and the Orphic mysteries used wine as part of their religious practices. During Dionysian festivals and rituals, wine was drunk as way to reach ecstatic states along with music and dance. Intoxication from alcohol was seen as a state of possession by spirit of the god of wine Dionysus. Religious drinking festivals called Bacchanalia were popular in Italy and associated with the gods Bacchus and Liber. These Dionysian rites were frequently outlawed by the Roman Senate.

In the Norse religion the drinking of ales and meads was important in several seasonal religious festivals such as Yule and Midsummer as well as more common festivities like wakes, christenings and ritual sacrifices called Blóts. Neopagan and Wiccan religions also allow for the use of alcohol for ritual purposes as well as for recreation.

Health
Research has been conducted by social scientists and epidemiologists to see if correlations exist between religiosity and alcoholism. It showed that, in Ireland, religious teenagers have a more restricted attitude towards alcohol, but the study was limited to Christianity. By contrast, in America, the extent of the correlation between alcohol consumption and religion depended upon religious denomination.

See also

 Noah's wine
 Religion and drugs
 Trappist beer

References

External links